Queens Park Rangers Football Club, also known as QPR, is an English association football club based in White City, London. The club originated from a merger between St Jude's and Christchurch Rangers in 1886, both of whom were founded in 1882. Initially an amateur side who played in the West London League and the second division of the London League, QPR joined the Southern Football League when they turned professional in 1898. After they won the league during the 1907–08 season, they participated in the first Charity Shield match and lost to Manchester United in a replay.

They joined the Football League Third Division in 1920, and in 1967 became the first Third Division side to win the League Cup. They have won four divisional titles in the English football league system, two in the second tier and two in the third. Their best placed finish in the system was as runners-up in the Football League First Division in the 1975–76 season, while their best achievement in the FA Cup was also as runners-up, in the 1981–82 competition.

As of the end of the 2021–22 season, the team have spent 23 seasons in the top tier of the English football league system, 33 in the second and 40 in the third tier. The table details the team's achievements and the top goalscorer in senior first-team competitions from their first professional season in the Southern Football League in the 1899–1900 season to the end of the most recently completed season. It includes the tournaments that QPR participated in during the First and Second World Wars, which are not counted against players' official statistics as they were unofficial and considered to be friendlies.

Key

Key to league record:
Pld – Matches played
W – Matches won
D – Matches drawn
L – Matches lost
GF – Goals for
GA – Goals against
Pts – Points
Pos – Final position

Key to colours and symbols:

Key to divisions and tournaments:
West London Observer Cup – West London Observer Football Challenge Cup
West London – West London League
London 2 – London League Division Two
Southern 1 – Southern League First Division
Southern 2 – Southern League Second Division
SP Floodlit Cup – Southern Professional Floodlit Cup
Western 1A – Western League Division 1A
Division 1 – Football League First Division
Division 2 – Football League Second Division
Division 3 – Football League Third Division
Division 3S – Football League Third Division South
Division 3SN – Football League Third Division South (North)
Division 3SN Cup – Football League Third Division South (North) Cup
London Com (Prin) – London Combination (Principal)
London Com (Supp) – London Combination (Supplementary)
League South 'B' – Wartime League South 'B'
League South 'D' – Wartime League South 'D'
Merc CC Trophy – Mercantile Credit Centenary Trophy
Premier – Premier League
Championship – EFL Championship
League One – EFL League One

Key to rounds:
Grp – Group stage
QR3 – Third qualifying round
QR4 – Fourth qualifying round, etc.
Pre – Preliminary round
R1 – First round
R2 – Second round, etc.
QF(S) – Quarter-final Southern section
QF – Quarter-final
SF(S) – Semi-final Southern section
SF – Semi-final
F(S) – Final Southern section
F – Final
W – Winners

Details for abandoned competitions: the 1938–39 Third Division South Cup and the 1939–40 Football League are shown in italics and appropriately footnoted.

Seasons

General sources:

Notes

References
Specific

General

External links
Queens Park Rangers F.C. official website

Seasons
 
Queens Park Rangers